Slapface is a 2021 American Indie horror film  written and directed by Jeremiah Kipp and produced by Mike Manning. A feature-length adaptation of Kipp's 2017 short film of the same name, it features an ensemble cast that includes Manning, August Maturo, Libe Barer, Dan Hedaya and Lukas Hassel as the film's monster.

The film premiered at the Cinequest Film Festival on March 20, 2021, where it won the Audience Award in the "Feature Thriller, Horror or Sci-Fi" category. It was released by Shudder and Epic Pictures Group in the United States on February 3, 2022.

Plot

Lucas and his neglectful older brother Tom live alone in a rundown home after the death of their mother, who took them away from their abusive father. They play a "game" called Slapface, which involves them slapping each other violently in the face, and Lucas's only "friends" are Donna, Rose and Moriah, a trio of female bullies.

One day, Lucas is forced by the trio to explore an abandoned house by the trio for "stalking" Moriah, who he has a crush on. He encounters a monster named Virago, and he befriends it over the course of several days.

Cast

Director Jeremiah Kipp, cinematographer Dominick Sivilli and co-executive producer Curtis Braly make cameos in the film, and real-life members of the Town of Fishkill Police Department also appear.

Production

Development
An idea for the film was inspired by Kipp's childhood and love of monster movies. Dominick Sivilli suggested to make a proof-of-concept short film. The short, completed in 2017, enjoyed a two-year film festival run and its lead child actor Joshua Kaufman was nominated for Best Performance in a Short Film – Young Actor at the 39th Young Artist Awards for his performance. After the short received positive reviews, Joe Benedetto and Mike Manning agreed to acquire and green-light the feature version, with William Sadler attached to play Sheriff John Thurston. A notable change that was made during the writing of the feature version was the re-conceiving of Lucas' father in the short version into his older brother, Tom.

Pre-production
In August 2019, August Maturo was cast in the lead role of Lucas and it was announced that Lukas Hassel will reprise his role as the Monster, now called the Virago Witch, from the original short film. That same month, Manning joined the cast as Tom and was confirmed to also produce the film. In September 2019, The D'Ambrosio Twins (Bianca and Chiara) and Mirabelle Lee joined the cast as Donna, Rose and Moriah. In November 2019, Libe Barer was added to the cast as Anna, with Dan Hedaya announced to take over for Sadler in the role of Sheriff John Thurston.

Filming
The film was shot at Umbra Sound Stages in Newburgh, New York and on location in the Hudson Valley from November 10 to December 3, 2019. The bar scenes were filmed at The Golden Rail Ale House in Newburgh.

Music

Barry J. Neely composed the film's score, which was released on Apple Music and Amazon Music on April 6, 2021. Curtis Braly's original song "Turn Down the Voices," which plays during the end credits and one of the bar scenes, was released as a single on February 4, 2022, the same day as its release on Shudder. About getting the opportunity to record the song for the film, Braly remarked "It was a fun challenge to dig deep inside myself to co-write and record a song that is so outside the box of anything I've done before." Jeremiah Kipp described the song as being written from "...the point of view of our main character. The effect was haunting, unsettling, emotional as Curtis leaned into the dark subtext of our narrative. When we heard his final version, chills ran down my spine."

Release
The film held its world premiere virtually at the Cinequest Film Festival on March 20, 2021, where it was ranked as one of the top seven trending films at the festival and the only horror film to trend. Kipp then hinted on Instagram at a later 2021 wide release in the United States.

The film also screened at Arrow Video FrightFest in the United Kingdom in August 2021. Prior to that screening, Shudder acquired the streaming distribution rights to the film in North America, the United Kingdom, Ireland, Australia, and New Zealand, with Epic Pictures Group handling worldwide sales and distribution through the "Dread" banner. This was followed by a screening at Grimfest 2021 on October 8, 2021, where August Maturo won the Reaper Award for Best Actor. It was released on Shudder on February 3, 2022.

Reception

The film received positive reviews from critics and viewers, with the writing, directing, originality, cinematography and the performances of Maturo and Manning being singled out for praise. 

Brian Skutle of Sonic Cinema gave the film an "A−" and compared it positively to the short film, while praising Maturo and Manning's performances, the cinematography, writing and directing. He further added that "It’s always fascinating to see how filmmakers approach expanding a basic idea into a longer narrative, and in doing so here, Kipp has maintained the heart of what the short film was, but expanded it successfully into an 85-minute narrative that is as unsettling as it is tragic."

Derek McCaw of Fanboy Planet wrote that "Slapface does a lot with a little — few locations and low budget. But it’s terrifically shot, suggesting more than showing and building a slow burning creepiness ... More might not have made more, and if the Virago isn’t a new entry into the ranks of iconic movie monsters, it still has some potential. Slapface is a solid monster movie with emotional undertones, and if that’s the movie you’re looking for, you’ll be rewarded." Debopriyaa Dutta of Screen Rant wrote that "Both Maturo and Manning are successful in conveying the hidden depths of pain within their characters, which manifest in distinct ways throughout the narrative ... Slapface is not without its flaws, as the execution of certain narrative leaps comes off as shoddy, and the overall emotional landscape is too depressing with no respite. Although immensely firm in its anti-bullying message, while expertly portraying the vignettes of trauma, Slapface is limited by the limitless void it creates, which ultimately swallows the film.

Accolades

References

External links
 
 

2021 films
2021 horror thriller films
2021 independent films
American horror thriller films
American monster movies
American independent films
Features based on short films
Horror film remakes
Films about brothers
Films about families
Films about children
Films about orphans
Films about police officers
Films about bullying
Films about friendship
Films about alcoholism
Films about grieving
Films about death
Films shot in New York (state)
2020s English-language films
2020s American films